Matt Bomer is an American actor who, as of 2022, has appeared in 19 films, 22 television productions and 6 stage productions.  His first stage appearance was at the age of seventeen as one of the young collector in an Alley production of the play A Streetcar Named Desire, while in high school. Bomer went on to appear in several television shows in the 2000s, including  the soap operas All My Children (2000) and Guiding Light (2002–2003), and the supernatural series Tru Calling (2003–2004). He made his film debut as a flight attendant in Robert Schwentke's psychological thriller Flightplan (2005), his highest-grossing release. Bomer's first leading role came in the David DiGilio's drama series, Traveler (2007), he gained a higher profile after that.

From 2009 to 2014, he starred in the USA Network police-procedural drama series White Collar as Neal Caffrey. For his performance in the series he won a People's Choice Award at the 2015 ceremony. He also served as a producer on the series. In 2011, Bomer was cast as a 105-year-old man in Andrew Niccol's science fiction thriller film In Time. The following year, he played a supporting role as a stripper in Steven Soderbergh's  comedy drama, Magic Mike (2012). He next portrayed the New York Times reporter Felix Turner in Ryan Murphy's television film The Normal Heart (2014), for which he received his first Golden Globe Award for Best Supporting Actor – Series, Miniseries or Television Film and nomination for Primetime Emmy Award for Outstanding Supporting Actor in a Limited Series or Movie.

In 2015, he reprised his role of Ken in Magic Mike XXL. The following year, he appeared in the neo-noir action comedy The Nice Guys (2016), and in Western action film  The Magnificent Seven (2016). Bomer played a hunter in Alex & Andrew Smith's  drama Walking Out and a trans woman in Timothy McNeil's drama Anything (both in 2017). In 2018, he made his directorial debut in the second season of Ryan Murphy's anthology series American Crime Story  (2016), about the murder of Gianni Versace. Also in 2018, Bomer made his Broadway debut with a revival of The Boys in the Band.

Roles

Films

Television

Stage

Discography

Awards and nominations

References

External links 
 
 

Lists of awards received by American actor
Male actor filmographies
American filmographies